"Skip a Rope' is a song written by Jack Moran and Glenn Douglas Tubb and recorded by American country music artist Henson Cargill, released in November 1967 as the first single and title track from the album Skip a Rope.  The song was Cargill's debut release on the country chart and his most successful single.  "Skip a Rope" was Cargill's sole No. 1 on the country chart, spending five weeks at the top and a total of 16 weeks on the chart.  "Skip a Rope" crossed over to the Top 40, peaking at No. 25.

Content
The song asked listeners to pay attention to what children would say as they played.  It touched on, among other things, verbal spousal abuse, tax evasion and racism, and at the end, laid blame for what the children said directly at the feet of their parents. Cargill's original recording featured background vocals by The Jordanaires.

Cover versions
The song was covered by The Kentucky Headhunters on their 1989 debut album Pickin' on Nashville, and by Charley Crockett on his 2021 album, Music City USA.

Chart performance

References

1967 singles
1967 debut singles
Henson Cargill songs
The Kentucky Headhunters songs
1967 songs
Monument Records singles
Songs about children
Song recordings produced by Don Law
Songs written by Glenn Douglas Tubb
Songs against racism and xenophobia